The term structured packing refers to a range of specially designed materials for use in absorption and distillation columns and chemical reactors.  Structured packings typically consist of thin corrugated metal plates or gauzes arranged in a way that force fluids to take complicated paths through the column, thereby creating a large surface area for contact between different phases.

Structured packing is formed from corrugated sheets of perforated embossed metal, plastic (including PTFE) or wire gauze. The result is a very open honeycomb structure with inclined flow channels giving a relatively high surface area but with very low resistance to gas flow. The surface enhancements have been chosen to maximize liquid spreading. These characteristics tend to show significant performance benefits in low pressure and low irrigation rate applications.

History

Structured packings have been established for several decades. The first generation of structured packing arose in the early 1940s. In 1953, a
patented packing appeared named Panapak, made of a wavy-form expanded metal sheet. The packing was not successful, due to maldistribution and lack of good marketing. The second generation appeared at the end of the 1950s, with highly efficient wire mesh packings, such as Goodloe, Hyperfil and Koch-Sulzer. Until the 1970s, due to their low pressure drop per theoretical stage, those packings were the most widely used in vacuum distillation. However, high cost, low capacity and high sensitivity to solids have prevented wider utilization of wire mesh packings.

Corrugated structured packings, introduced by Sulzer by the end of the 1970s, marked the third generation of structured packed columns. These packings offer high capacity, lower cost, and less sensitivity to solids, while keeping a high performance. Popularity of the packings grew in the 1980s, particularly for revamps in oil and petrochemical plants. These structured packings, made of corrugated metal sheets, had their surfaces treated, chemically or mechanically, in order to enhance their wettability. Consequently, the packings' wetted area increased, improving performance.  In 1994, a new geometry was developed, and called Optiflow. Later, in 1999, an improved structure of corrugated sheet packings, the MellapackPlus, was developed based on CFD simulations and experiment. This new structure, compared with conventional Mellapak, has a lowered pressure drop and maximum useful capacity could be extended up to 50%.

Varieties

Structured packing is manufactured in a wide range of sizes by varying the crimp altitude.

Applications

Typical applications include vacuum and atmospheric crude oil fractionators, FCC main fractionators and TEG contactors. The separation of mono-, di- and triethanolamine, conducted under vacuum, may also utilize structured packing, owing to its relatively low pressure drop. Tall oil fractionation, the process of separating fatty acids from rosin acids and pitch  obtained as a by-product of the Kraft process of wood pulp manufacture, also utilizes structured packing. The packing additionally finds use in the manufacture of styrene monomer and the dehydration of glycol in natural gas processing.

Structured packing also finds use in the equipment/processes below:

 Air separation
 Cyclohexanone/Cyclohexanol separation
 Xylene splitters
 CO2 absorbers
 H2S absorbers
 Ethylene oxide absorbers
 Acrylonitrile absorbers
 Oleo Chemicals 
 Fine Chemicals

Advantages

Structured packing offers the following advantages as compared to the use of random packing and trays:

 Lower pressure drop
 Higher efficiency (given the same tower height)
 Higher capacity
 Reduced liquid hold-up

Disadvantages

Structured packing offers the following disadvantages as compared to the use of random packing and trays:

 Cost
 Greater sensitivity to maldistribution

See also 
 Packed bed
 Raschig ring
Dixon rings 
Random column packing

References

Distillation